Ransomville is an unincorporated community in Franklin County, Kansas, United States.  It is located approximately 2 miles northeast of Williamsburg at the intersection of U.S. 50 highway and Hamilton Road.

History
Ransomville was named for J. H. Ransom, who founded the first store around which the town was built up.

A post office was opened in Ransomville in 1881, and remained in operation until it was discontinued in 1915.

References

Further reading

External links
 Franklin County maps: Current, Historic, KDOT

Unincorporated communities in Franklin County, Kansas
Unincorporated communities in Kansas